Kapatagan is the name of two places in the Philippines:

Kapatagan, Lanao del Norte
Kapatagan, Lanao del Sur